Urotrygon is a genus of American round stingrays.

Species
There are currently thirteen recognized species in this genus:
 Urotrygon aspidura D. S. Jordan & C. H. Gilbert, 1882 (Spiny-tail round ray)
 Urotrygon caudispinosus Hildebrand, 1946 (Spine-tailed round ray)
 Urotrygon chilensis Günther, 1872 (Chilean round ray)
 Urotrygon cimar López S. & W. A. Bussing, 1998 (Denticled roundray)
 Urotrygon microphthalmum Delsman, 1941 (Smalleyed round stingray)
 Urotrygon munda T. N. Gill, 1863 (Munda round ray)
 Urotrygon nana Miyake & McEachran, 1988 (Dwarf round ray)
 Urotrygon peruanus Hildebrand, 1946 (Peruvian stingray)
 Urotrygon reticulata Miyake & McEachran, 1988 (Reticulate round ray)
 Urotrygon rogersi D. S. Jordan & Starks, 1895 (Roger's round ray)
 Urotrygon serrula Hildebrand, 1946 (Saw-spined round ray)
 Urotrygon simulatrix Miyake & McEachran, 1988 (Fake round ray)
 Urotrygon venezuelae L. P. Schultz, 1949 (Venezuela round stingray)

References

 
Urotrygonidae
Ray genera
Taxa named by Theodore Gill
Taxonomy articles created by Polbot